Abdelkarim Hussein Mohamed Al-Nasser is a Saudi Arabian alleged member and suspected leader of the organization Hezbollah Al-Hijaz, wanted in the United States in connection with the June 25, 1996 Khobar Towers bombing in Dhahran, Saudi Arabia, which killed 19 U.S. Air Force personnel and wounded 498 other people of many nationalities.

Early life 
Al-Nasser was born in Al Ihsa, Saudi Arabia and speaks Arabic and Persian.

Wanted terrorist 
Al-Nasser has been on the FBI Most Wanted Terrorists list since its inception in 2001. The Rewards for Justice Program is offering up to US$5 million for information leading to the capture of Abdelkarim Al-Nasser. Abdelkarim Hussein Mohamed Al-Nasser has been indicted in the Eastern District of Virginia for the June 25, 1996, bombing of the Khobar Towers military housing complex in Dhahran, Kingdom of Saudi Arabia. Al-Nasser is the alleged leader of the terrorist organization, Saudi Hizballah.

Personal Information

References

External links
 Abdelkarim profile at FBI Most Wanted Terrorists site
 Abdelkarim profile at Rewards For Justice

Living people
People from Al-Hasa
Saudi Arabian mass murderers
Saudi Arabian Shia Muslims
FBI Most Wanted Terrorists
Fugitives wanted by the United States
Individuals designated as terrorists by the United States government
Year of birth missing (living people)